The 1999 Bank of the West Classic doubles was the doubles event of the twenty-eighth edition of the first tournament in the US Open Series.

Lindsay Davenport and Natasha Zvereva were the defending champions, but Zvereva did not compete this year. Davenport partnered up with Corina Morariu, and won her fifth Bank of the West Classic title in six years.

Seeds

Draw

Qualifying

Seeds

Qualifiers
  Maureen Drake /  Louise Pleming

Qualifying draw

External links
 ITF doubles results page

Singles
Bank of the West Classic - Doubles